Gramoz Pashko (11 February 1955 – 16 July 2006) was an Albanian economist and politician. He co-founded the Democratic Party of Albania in 1990 and later served as rector of the University of New York, Tirana. Pashko was married to Mimoza Ruli, sister of politician Genc Ruli.

Early life and education
Gramoz Pashko was the son of Josif Pashko. He was a graduate of the University of Tirana. He received a bachelor's degree in 1977, a master's degree in 1983 and a PhD in 1989, all in economics.

Career
Pashko was the cofounder of the Democratic Party that was established in 1990. In 1991, he served as the deputy prime minister and minister of economy in the cabinet led by the then prime minister Ylli Bufi. A few months later, he quit the positions and the Democratic Party membership to form the Democratic Alliance Party. Gramoz Pashko decided to rejoin the Democratic Party, undergoing a vote on the structures of the latter. At the last congress of the Democratic Party, Pashko was elected a member of the National Council of the Democratic Party. Pashko also served as economic advisor to several left wing prime ministers.

Death
Pashko hit his head on 16 July 2006 while diving in the sea in Himara, southern Albania. The Bell 222 helicopter transporting him to Bari, Italy, for medical treatment crashed over the Adriatic Sea. Six people died in the crash: the two pilots, an engineer, a doctor; Pashko and his son Ruben, who was traveling with him.

References

External links
Gramoz Pashko, Pro-democracy leader in Albania
Gramoz Pashko 

1955 births
2006 deaths
University of Tirana alumni
Albanian economists
Democratic Party of Albania politicians
Deputy Prime Ministers of Albania
Government ministers of Albania
Economy ministers of Albania
Victims of aviation accidents or incidents in international waters
Victims of helicopter accidents or incidents
People from Kolonjë
Politicians from Tirana